Nīca Parish is an administrative unit of South Kurzeme Municipality in the Courland region of Latvia.

Villages of Nīca parish 

Parishes of Latvia
South Kurzeme Municipality
Courland